Kalophrynus heterochirus is a species of frog in the family Microhylidae.
It is found in Indonesia and Malaysia.
Its natural habitats are subtropical or tropical moist lowland forests, subtropical or tropical moist montane forests, intermittent freshwater marshes, and heavily degraded former forest.
It is threatened by habitat loss.

References

Kalophrynus
Taxonomy articles created by Polbot
Amphibians described in 1900